Béla Fleck and the Flecktones is an American band that combines jazz and bluegrass music.

The Flecktones formed in 1988 when Béla Fleck was invited to perform on the PBS TV series The Lonesome Pine Specials. The original members were Fleck on banjo, Victor Wooten on bass guitar, his brother Roy Wooten on Drumitar, and Howard Levy on harmonica and keyboards. After Levy's departure in 1992 the group continued as a trio for several years until recruiting Jeff Coffin in 1997 on saxophones. Coffin quit the group in 2010, and Levy rejoined in 2011.

History

Formation 
Near the end of his time with the New Grass Revival band, Fleck was invited to play for the Lonesome Pine Special on PBS in 1988, and he gathered a group of musicians to assist him. He had met Howard Levy the year before at the Winnipeg Folk Festival. Victor Wooten auditioned over the phone and volunteered his brother Roy as a potential member.

After the PBS performance, Fleck decided to keep the group together, calling it Bela Fleck and the Flecktones. His compositions became more complex. The Flecktones merged bluegrass with jazz, presenting record store owners with the problem of selecting a genre under which to stock their whimsically titled albums, whose covers bore cartoons. The leader played electric banjo and was influenced by the Kentucky bluegrass of Earl Scruggs and "The Ballad of Jed Clampett". Victor Wooten broke into jazz bass solos. Roy Wooten called himself "Future Man" and played drumitar, an instrument of his own creation. Melodies were usually taken by Howard Levy. Their first video, "Sinister Minister", was in rotation at the networks VH-1, which played pop and adult contemporary music; BET, the Black Entertainment channel; and Country Music Television. They performed at jazz festivals with soul singer Stevie Wonder, blues guitarist Bonnie Raitt, and the Christian a cappella group Take 6. Followers of the Grateful Dead took note.

Recording
Their debut album, Bela Fleck and the Flecktones (Warner Bros, 1989), received a Grammy nomination for Best Contemporary Jazz Album, as did their second album, Flight of the Cosmic Hippo (Warner Bros., 1991), which also received a nomination for Best Instrumental Composition for the song "Blu-Bop". Their second album contained the Flecktones's version of "The Star-Spangled Banner". Their next album had another cartoon cover and the palindromic title UFO TOFU (Warner Bros., 1992). The song "Bonnie & Slyde" had Fleck playing banjo atypically with a slide, an idea suggested to him by slide guitarist Bonnie Raitt.

UFO Tofu would be the last album the Flecktones recorded with their original lineup until Rocket Science in 2011. Howard Levy left the band in December 1992. While the departure of Levy was tough for the band, it was not unexpected. During their 1992 tour it became evident to the band that Levy was not happy with the rigors of touring and wanted to spend more time with his wife and children.

The remaining trio, consisting of Fleck and the Wooten brothers, recorded their fourth album, Three Flew Over the Cuckoo's Nest. "'Once we started rehearsing, everything was fine,' said Fleck. 'We started finding ways to sound good, and it was real exciting.'" Without Levy, the Flecktones as usual spent most of 1993 on the road and released Three Flew Over the Cuckoo's Nest in September of that year.

Return to quartet 

In April 1997, the Flecktones became a quartet again, as they added saxophone player Jeff Coffin to the mix. Coffin would remain in the band from 1997 until 2008. In June 1997, the Flecktones opened for the Dave Matthews Band. In July the Flecktones toured Europe and sat in on the second set of a Phish show in Lyon, France. This marked the second and final time that the Flecktones played with Phish.

In June 1998, the Flecktones released their sixth album, and fifth studio album, Left of Cool. It represented a switch from previous Flecktones albums, as the band, according to critic Terri Horak, "jettisoned their self-imposed rule to only record what could be duplicated on live instruments." In July 2000, the Flecktones released their seventh album, Outbound, another studio album. The Flecktones' philosophy with this album was to do something different from everything they had done before. What makes Outbound unique is the way in which the Flecktones recorded the album. The quartet recorded each track on the album, then invited guest musicians to overdub vocals or instrumentation. Outbound guests include Jon Anderson from Yes, Shawn Colvin, and John Medeski, of Medeski, Martin and Wood, to name a few.

Live at the Quick, which was also released as a DVD, is the band's eighth album and second live album. For fans of live Flecktones, this album, like Live Art, successfully captured the sound and feel of the Flecktones in concert.

In February 2006, the band released their tenth album, The Hidden Land. As with every Flecktones album, they needed to change something from their last album. For The Hidden Land, the Flecktones didn't want any guest musicians. "'The truth is, the last few records are not what we are,' Fleck said. 'Obviously, we loved playing with those musicians, but if you keep on doing it, you become a gathering point rather than a group with its own identity.'" For the Flecktones to keep moving forward, they felt their music had to get back to the roots of the quartet.

Reunion 
In June 2012, following another summer tour, the Flecktones announced their hiatus as a band. In January 2016, the Flecktones announced a short reunion tour scheduled for June 2016, confirming an appearance at the Telluride Bluegrass Festival on June 16, 2016. In 2017, the band announced concerts for June–August 2017, and also confirmed a tour with Chick Corea Elektric Band in August 2017.

Critical reception
Thom Jurek of Allmusic.com called the Flecktones's music an "unclassifiable meld of jazz, progressive bluegrass, rock, classical, funk, and world music traditions," a style sometimes dubbed "blu-bop".

Of the album Bela Fleck and the Flecktones critic Geoffrey Himes wrote, "Fleck's banjo-playing takes the quartet on wide tangents through the outer space of jazz improvisation and minimalist composition, but he always brings them back to the traditions of rural America."

The quartet received attention for their musical innovations and invention, including praise from music critic Bill Kolhaase. However, he was critical of the band's lack of a drum kit, claiming that Wooten's "electronic beat seemed a bit muddy compared to the real thing".

Cosmic Hippo was received favorably. Himes applauded their prodigious improvisatory ability. John Griffin of The Gazette also praised the group's ability to create such an individual style that "the whole of idea of style disappears." Mike Joyce, of The Washington Post was impressed by the Flecktones' ability to maintain a distinct voice. Joyce called a Flecktones show a "musical free-for-all, embracing the band's recorded material and venturing off into the great unknown." Jim Santella of the Buffalo News praised the band's mastery of styles and their ability to weave together complicated pieces. Santella even compared Fleck's playing to a "miniature Bach canon."

Geoffrey Himes remarked that Left of Cool sounded too ordinary. In his negative review he wrote, "Unfortunately the Flecktones' first studio album in five years reveals that they've become a very ordinary band." Himes adds, "The four Flecktones are all marvelous musicians, and they come up with imaginative parts for the new album's 15 cuts. The overall concept, however has diminished into easy-to-digest pop-jazz, for which there is too much already."

Hidden Land received mixed reviews. Critic Michael Endelman of Entertainment Weekly, wrote that the Flecktones sound "hasn't aged well." Dan Ouelette of Billboard found Hidden Land to be "by far their best album." Ouelette was particularly impressed by the quartet's range of repertoire in this album.

Jingle All the Way was well received. Geoffrey Himes praised the band for being able to package the Flecktones' complex sound into an easily digestible holiday album without having to compromise.

Jeff Kelman of Jazz Times writes favorably about Rocket Science and Levy's reunion with the Flecktones, "Rocket Science recaptures everything that made the Flecktones so fresh, so innovative, so important during its first five years." Kelman particularly praised the album's writing and the interactions between Levy and Fleck. AllMusic critic Thom Jurek also gave Rocket Science a rave review, "Rocket Science fires on all cylinders and comes off as a fresh and exciting reintroduction to a newly energized Flecktones."

Awards and honors

Discography

Studio albums
 Béla Fleck and the Flecktones (1990)
 Flight of the Cosmic Hippo (1991)
 UFO Tofu (1992)
 Three Flew Over the Cuckoo's Nest (1993)
 Left of Cool (1998)
 Outbound (2000)
 Little Worlds (2003)
 The Hidden Land (2006)
 Jingle All the Way (2008)
 Rocket Science (2011)

Live albums
 Live Art (1996)
 Live at the Quick (2002)

Compilation albums
 Greatest Hits of the 20th Century (1999)

Band members
Béla Fleck – banjos, synthesizers, guitar (1988–)
Howard Levy – harmonicas, piano, keyboards, jaw harp (1988–1993, 2010–)
Victor Wooten – bass guitars, double bass, cello (1988–)
Roy Wooten ("Future Man") – drumitar, drums, percussion, electronic drums (1988–)

Former
Jeff Coffin – saxophones, flute, clarinet, synthesizers (1998–2010)

Timeline

References

External links
 

Jazz fusion ensembles
American jazz ensembles
American bluegrass music groups
Jam bands
Musical groups from Nashville, Tennessee
Grammy Award winners
Musical groups established in 1988
Progressive bluegrass music groups
Columbia Records artists
Rounder Records artists
Warner Records artists
Jazz musicians from Tennessee